The Columbia Law Review is a law review edited and published by students at Columbia Law School. The journal publishes scholarly articles, essays, and student notes.

It was established in 1901 by Joseph E. Corrigan and John M. Woolsey, who served as the review's first editor-in-chief and secretary. The Columbia Law Review is one of four law reviews that publishes the Bluebook.

History 
The Columbia Law Review represents the school's third attempt at a student-run law periodical.  In 1885, the Columbia Jurist was founded by a group of six students but ceased publication in 1887.  Despite its short run, the Jurist is credited with partially inspiring the creation of the Harvard Law Review, which began publication a short time later.

The second journal, the Columbia Law Times was founded in 1887 and closed down in 1893 due to lack of revenue.

Publication of the current Columbia Law Review began in 1901, making it the fifth oldest surviving law review in the US.  Dean William Keener took an active involvement during its founding to help ensure its longevity.

Impact 
The Columbia Law Review was the top-cited law journal during the 2018 Supreme Court term.

According to the Journal Citation Reports the Columbia Law Review had a 2009 impact factor of 3.610, ranking it third out of 116 journals in the category "Law". In 2007 the Columbia Law Review ranked second for submissions and citations within the legal academic community, after Harvard Law Review.

Notable alumni 
Notable alumni of the Columbia Law Review include:
U.S. Supreme Court Justices
William O. Douglas
Ruth Bader Ginsburg
U.S. Courts of Appeals Judges
Wilfred Feinberg
Harold Leventhal
Paul R. Hays
Harold Medina
Jerre Stockton Williams
James Alger Fee
Daniel M. Friedman
Joseph Frank Bianco
Barbara Lagoa
U.S. District Courts Judges
Jack Weinstein
Miriam Goldman Cedarbaum
Denise Cote
Alvin Hellerstein
William Bernard Herlands
John S. Martin Jr.
Edmund Louis Palmieri
Alexander Holtzoff
Dickinson Richards Debevoise
Richard F. Boulware
James Edward Doyle
U.S. Solicitors General
Charles Fried
Donald Verrilli Jr.
Chairwoman of the Securities and Exchange Commission Mary Jo White
Director of the CIA William Colby
U.S. Attorney for the Southern District of New York Preet Bharara
Chairman of the Federal Reserve Bank of New York and Director of the National Economic Council Stephen Friedman (PFIAB)
Columbia University president Lee C. Bollinger
Columbia Law School deans
Young B. Smith
Michael I. Sovern
Barbara Aronstein Black
 Columbia Law School professors
Herbert Wechsler
Oscar Schachter
Walter Gellhorn
Harvey Goldschmid
R. Kent Greenawalt
Gillian E. Metzger
E. Allan Farnsworth
University of Pennsylvania Law School professors
Geoffrey C. Hazard Jr.
Howard Lesnick (Editor-in-Chief)
Amy Wax
Yale Law School professors
Felix S. Cohen
Geoffrey C. Hazard Jr.
Duke University School of Law professor George C. Christie
Michigan Law School professor Mark D. West
New York University Law School professor Samuel Estreicher
Berkeley professor and criminal law scholar Sanford Kadish
New York Governor George Pataki
Virginia Lt. Gov. Justin Fairfax
Two-time SEC General Counsel David M. Becker
NBA Commissioner David Stern
New York Supreme Court Justice Aron Steuer
Prominent attorneys
George Davidson
Arthur Garfield Hays
Gary P. Naftalis
Charles Rembar
Louis S. Weiss
Authors
Brad Meltzer

Past Editors-in-Chief

Notable articles

References

External links 
 

American law journals
Columbia University academic journals
Publications established in 1901
General law journals
English-language journals
Law journals edited by students
8 times per year journals